HMS Mercury was one of two  despatch vessels, later redesignated as second class cruiser built for the Royal Navy during the 1870s. The two ships were the first all-steel warships in the Royal Navy.

Design and description
The Iris-class ships were designed as dispatch vessels and were later redesignated as second-class protected cruisers. The ships displaced  at normal load and were the first British warships with an all-steel hull. Their crew consisted of 275 officers and ratings.

The Iris class was powered by a pair of horizontal four-cylinder Maudslay, Sons and Field compound-expansion steam engines, each driving one propeller shaft using steam from eight oval and four cylindrical boilers. Originally equipped with a light barque rig, her sails were soon removed and the class became the first "mastless cruisers".

The Iris-class ships were originally armed with ten 64-pounder rifled muzzle-loading (RML) guns, eight on the main deck and the remaining pair on the upper deck on pivot mounts to serve as chase guns fore and aft.

Construction and career
Mercury was laid down at Pembroke Dockyard on 16 March 1876, launched on 17 April 1878 and completed in September 1879.

Mercury served with the Portsmouth Reserve from 1879 to 1890, in China from 1890 to 1895 and with the Portsmouth Reserve again from 1895 to 1903. She served as a navigation school ship for navigating officers from 1903 to 1905 and a submarine depot ship at Portsmouth from 1906 to 1913, and at Harwich in 1913. There were plans to rename her Columbine in 1912, but these were rescinded and instead she was hulked at Rosyth in 1914 with the port depot ship there, HMS Columbine, the former . She was moved to Chatham, where she became an accommodation ship from 7 January 1918, and was paid off in March 1919. She was eventually sold for scrap to the Forth Shipbreaking Company, at Bo'ness, on 9 July 1919.

Notes

Bibliography
 
 
 
 
 Morris, Douglas (1987). Cruisers of the Royal and Commonwealth Navies. Liskeard: Maritime Books. .
 *

 

Iris-class cruisers
Ships built in Pembroke Dock
1878 ships